This is a list of ancient monoliths found in all types of Greek and Roman buildings.

It contains monoliths
quarried, but not moved 
quarried and moved
quarried, moved and lifted clear off the ground into their position (architraves etc.)
quarried, moved and erected in an upright position (columns etc.)

Transporting was done by land or water (or a combination of both), in the later case often by special-built ships such as obelisk carriers. For lifting operations, ancient cranes were employed since ca. 515 BC, such as in the construction of Trajan's Column.

It should be stressed that all numbers are estimations since only in the rarest cases have monoliths been actually weighed. Rather, weight is calculated by multiplying volume by density. The main source, J. J. Coulton, assumes 2.75 t/m3 for marble and 2.25 t/m3 for other stone. For an explanation of the large margin of error, which often leads to widely differing numbers, see these introductory remarks.

Greek monoliths 

Below a selection of Greek monoliths sorted by their date.

Roman monoliths 
Below a selection of Roman monoliths sorted by their date; the list also includes work on Greek temples which was continued into the Roman era.

Gallery

Greek monoliths

Roman monoliths

See also 
 Record-holding monoliths in antiquity
 List of largest monoliths in the world
 List of obelisks in Rome

Notes

References

Sources

Further reading

External links 
 Traianus – Technical investigation of Roman public works

List of ancient monoliths
 List of ancient monoliths
List of ancient monoliths
List of ancient monoliths
List of ancient monoliths
Monoliths
Monoliths
Ancient monoliths